Huddersfield Town's 2002–03 campaign saw them relegated to the bottom division for the first time since the 1979–80 season. Huddersfield endured a dreadful season under Mick Wadsworth. That season saw Wadsworth sacked twice, but on the first attempt of him being sacked, he was re-hired because the club couldn't pay him off. Mel Machin took over for the last month of the season, but couldn't stop the Terriers relegating to the Football League Third Division. Town's main worry during the season was administration, which nearly saw the club liquidated.

Squad at the start of the season

Review
Mick Wadsworth was appointed manager of the Terriers during the close season with many people predicting Town would have as good a season as the previous season, which saw them lose in the play-offs to Brentford, but Wadsworth's new 4-3-3 formation wasn't pleasing fans and players alike. During the early part of the season, Town had a run of scoring 1 goal in 6 matches. The only highlight of the early part of the season was taking Division 1 Burnley to extra time in the second round of the Worthington Cup, before losing 1–0.

Christmas and New Year also bore little joy to the Terriers and went on a run of 5 losses from 6, before a mini revival which saw them unbeaten in 5 matches, before another dip which saw them lose another 5 in 6. That saw Wadsworth lose his job in late March, which then saw Mel Machin take over as caretaker manager and after managing to draw with eventual champions Wigan Athletic, many thought that Town might survive, but bad consecutive losses to Stockport County and Port Vale saw Town go down.

Squad at the end of the season

Results

Division Two

FA Cup

Worthington Cup

LDV Vans Trophy

Appearances and goals

References

Huddersfield Town A.F.C. seasons
Huddersfield Town